Golsar may refer to:

 Golsar, Savojbolagh, a city in Savojbolagh County, Alborz Province, Iran
 Golsar, Gilan, a suburb of Rasht in the province of Gilan, Iran

See also
 Golsara